"Do Pizza Bots Dream of Electric Guitars" is the 15th episode of the thirty-second season of the American animated television series The Simpsons, and the 699th episode overall. It aired in the United States on Fox on March 14, 2021. The episode was directed by Jennifer Moeller, and written by Michael Price. In this episode, Homer attempts to reunite an animatronic band from his youth, but TV and film producer J. J. Abrams gets ahold of them first. The episode was given extremely positive reviews. The title of the episode is a play to the dystopian novel Do Androids Dream of Electric Sheep? by Philip K. Dick.

J. J. Abrams guest-stars as himself. The episode is dedicated in memory of David Richardson, a writer and producer of The Simpsons who died on January 18, 2021.

Plot
In a flashback to Homer's adolescence, 14-year old Homer goes to work at his job at Razzle Dazzle's Pizza-Tainment Palace and helps fix a short-circuiting problem by having the animatronic band sing hip-hop and rap. The audience love it, but the FBI shuts the business down due to Homer's boss Gil Gunderson using the band for trafficking cocaine.

Back in the present day, Marge sees that something has changed in Homer since the flashback. Moe visits the house and agrees with Marge. Bart and Lisa decide to search for the animatronics, beginning by contacting Gil. Gil had tracked the animatronics down which were sold by the FBI at an auction: Marge takes Hippie Hippo from Professor Frink, Moe takes Foxy Lady from Sideshow Mel, Lisa takes Jive Turkey from Disco Stu, and both Bart and Lisa go to obtain Wakkety Yak from Herman's Military Antiques.

Herman reveals he just sold Yak to J. J. Abrams to create a new Mission: Impossible movie. Lisa and Bart arrive at one of Abrams' buildings and attempt to steal Yak but are caught. Homer arrives and is overcome with emotion upon seeing Yak. Abrams appears and understands Homer's situation, only for him to plan a nine-movie franchise involving the animatronics, giving Homer the same trauma as before.

Homer encounters Comic Book Guy, who advises Homer to take his complaints to the internet. Homer spends months complaining online, only to have Abrams announce a screening of the movie in Springfield. Homer enters the theater to stop Abrams, but Grampa arrives after being called by Marge. Grampa says that he ruined Homer's childhood by neglecting Homer's dreams. They reconcile and Abrams surprises Homer as he had reprogrammed the animatronics and brought them on stage now to dispense frozen yogurt at the after party.

The ending credits feature Comic Book Guy having formed the Troll Force Five, Earth's spite-iest heroes.

Production

Casting
J. J. Abrams guest-stars in the episode as himself, while Professor Frink appears, voiced by Hank Azaria.

Release
The episode aired on March 14, 2021. It was supposed to air on March 7, but due to "Diary Queen" being pre-empted to February 21, 2021 due to the 2021 Daytona 500 delays, it was moved back to March 14, competing with the 63rd Grammy Awards that night.

Reception

Viewing figures
In the United States, the episode was watched live by 1.43 million viewers.

Critical response
Tony Sokol with Den of Geek said, "“Do PizzaBots Dream of Electric Guitars?' is the best episode of the season so far, and a classic installment to The Simpsons repertoire. Clearly up to par with the best of the classics. It is so satisfying, it feels as if it was individually made to suit me, just like J. J. Abrams would’ve done." He also gave the episode five out of five stars.

Retconned continuity
Executive Producer Matt Selman responded to outrage and criticism by fans in regards to Homer's timeline change (being a teenager in the early 1990s) both on Twitter  and in articles. He later explained his view of one-off episodes such as this, as well as continuity for The Simpsons in general, in an interview with IGN, stating "We're not saying this is the official continuity now, and none of that other stuff happened. We're just saying in this one episode, this is a silly way to present the character’s life. It doesn't mean that the people's beloved episodes from the past didn't happen. They all kind of happened in their imaginary world, you know, and people can choose to love whichever version they love."

References

The Simpsons (season 32) episodes
2021 American television episodes